The Christchurch Central by-election of 1979 was a by-election during the 39th New Zealand Parliament. It was prompted by the death of Bruce Barclay, a Labour Party MP, and resulted in Geoffrey Palmer, also of the Labour Party, being elected to replace him for the seat of Christchurch Central. Palmer would eventually go on to become Prime Minister. The by-election was somewhat embarrassing for the National Party, whose candidate was pushed into third place by Social Credit's Terry Heffernan.

Background
Bruce Barclay, the incumbent MP, died on 28 June 1979. He had been ill for some months prior to his death where it was reported he was suffering from cancer and had already had two surgical operations. His absence was noticed at Labour's first caucus meeting in February 1979 and Labour leader Bill Rowling stated he had visited Barclay earlier and expressed concern at his health after Barclay had become unable to perform his electorate duties earlier in the month.

Candidates

Labour
As Christchurch Central was a safe Labour seat, there was a large amount of interest in the candidacy from the local Labour Party. There were 18 nominated candidates for the nomination. They were:

Barry Brown, the South Island secretary of the Labourer's Union and member of the Labour Party Executive who was Labour's  campaign manager in 
David Close, Christchurch City Councillor for Pegasus Ward and Labour's  candidate for 
Alister Graham, a member of the Christchurch Central electorate committee
Cathy Hiniona, Christchurch organiser for the Housewives' Boycott Movement
Graham McCann, a Lyttelton Borough Councillor and chairman of the  electorate committee
Don McKenzie, an Ashburton Borough Councillor and Labour's  candidate for 
Charles Manning, a classics lecturer at University of Canterbury
David Penney, a vehicle inspector at the Ministry of Transport
Helene Ritchie, a psychologist and Wellington City Councillor who was Labour's  candidate for 
Don Rowlands, a teacher and Christchurch City Councillor for the North Ward
JJ Stewart, former All Blacks coach and Labour's  candidate for 
Brian West, a farmer and chairman of the Waikato Labour Regional Council
Trevor Young, a postal worker who was Labour's  candidate for 

Despite the large field of candidates, there were three who emerged as frontrunners by the time nominations had closed; McCann, Matthewson and Palmer − and it was widely known that Palmer was Rowling's preferred choice. The selection meeting was held on 23 July at Linwood Intermediate School with over one hundred delegates present. A straw poll of members showed a majority of support for Palmer. The nominees were shortened to three; McCann, Matthewson and Palmer who were invited for interviews with the selection panel. Palmer was chosen and his success as the nominee was announced by party president Jim Anderton to the members present at 2:00 am.

National
National selected 29-year-old insurance consultant David Duncan. He was chairman of National's St Albans branch.

Social Credit
The Social Credit Party selected a high school teacher Terry Heffernan as their candidate. Heffernan had a high-profile endorsement from former Labour MP and party vice-president Gerald O'Brien, reaffirming his rift with Labour.

Others
The Values Party decided not to contest the by-election. Values spokesperson Peter Heal said the party felt its future lay in being a pressure group rather than as a party and was applying its own conservation principles of not wasting resources by not standing a candidate. He said they would concentrate on applying pressure to the Labour Party to adopt Values policy.
Suzanne Adelia Sadler campaigned under the name "Tinkerbell" for the Tory Party describing herself as a "slave" of the Canterbury Wizard.
Perennial candidate Michael "Tubby" Hansen stood for the Economic Euthenics party. He described himself as a "gas chopper-offer" and had stood in several parliamentary and civic elections.

Results
The following table gives the election results:

Labour increased its vote slightly but the largest gains were made by the Social Credit Party, who came second in an urban seat for the first time in its history. National were pushed into third place who saw their vote shrink to the point where its candidate only just managed to avoid losing their deposit.

Notes

References

Christchurch Central 1979
1979 elections in New Zealand
1970s in Christchurch
Politics of Christchurch
August 1979 events in New Zealand